Two ships of the United States Navy have been named USS Vella Gulf, after the 1943 battle of Vella Gulf in the Solomon Islands. The names of these are sometimes incorrectly reported as Vela Gulf.

 The first  was an escort carrier in service for just over a year, during 1945 and 1946.
 The second  is a guided missile cruiser commissioned in 1993 and on active service as of 2016.

United States Navy ship names